New Zealand's Top 100 History Makers was a weekly television programme first shown on Prime Television New Zealand on 6 October 2005. 430 notable New Zealanders were ranked by a panel to determine the 100 most influential in New Zealand history. There were six episodes to present the list, and a final (seventh) episode, screened live on 17 November 2005, showed the rankings of the top ten of these people as a result of votes collected from the public via text and internet. (These votes are not statistically valid as they involve self-selected voters).

Diana Wichtel, reviewing the show in the New Zealand Listener, described it as "surprisingly watchable", but commented that the format was "history as striptease, with the programme counting down over the weeks to the big winner." Scott Kara, writing in The New Zealand Herald, called it "educational but not dull". Another review described it as "history ... as an Idol-style talent search".

Joseph Romanos, one of the panellists, produced a book later in 2005 containing profiles of the same 100 people. The book was revised for a 2008 edition.

Panel 
The show's rankings were produced by merging the ratings of eight panellists, who are all well-known New Zealanders:

Stacey Daniels – Television and radio personality
Raybon Kan – Comedian
Robyn Langwell – Editor of North & South magazine
Douglas Lloyd-Jenkins – Writer and historian
Melanie Nolan – Historian
Joseph Romanos – radio host, sports writer
Tainui Stephens – Television producer
Kerre Woodham – Radio personality

Panel rankings 

Ernest Rutherford (1871–1937) – physicist
Kate Sheppard (1848–1934) – suffragist
Sir Edmund Hillary (1919–2008) – mountaineer and explorer
Sir George Grey (1812–1898) – Governor and Premier
Michael Joseph Savage (1872–1940) – politician
Sir Āpirana Ngata (1874–1950) – Māori politician
Hōne Heke (c.1807/1808 – 1850) – Māori chief
Dr Frederick Truby King (1858–1938) – founder of Plunket Society
William Hobson (1792–1842) – co-author of the Treaty of Waitangi
Jean Batten (1909–1982) – aviatrix
Sir Brian Barratt-Boyes (1924–2006) – heart surgeon
Sir Peter Snell (1938–2019) – runner
Bill Pickering (1910–2004) – space scientist
Sir Peter Jackson (born 1961) – film maker
Janet Frame (1924–2004) – writer
Te Rauparaha (1760s–1849) – Māori leader
Sir Colin Meads (1936–2017) – All Black
Dame Whina Cooper (1895–1994) – Māori leader
Katherine Mansfield (1888–1923) – writer
Thomas Brydone (1837–1904) and William Soltau Davidson (1846–1924) – refrigeration pioneers
Richard Pearse (1877–1953) – aviation pioneer
Te Whiti o Rongomai (c.1830–1907) – pacifist Māori leader
Richard Seddon (1845–1906) – Premier and Prime Minister of New Zealand
Sir Te Rangi Hīroa (Peter Buck) (1877–1951) – Māori leader
Sir Julius Vogel (1835–1899) – politician
Maurice Wilkins (1916–2004) – scientist Nobel laureate
Helen Clark (born 1950) – politician
Mabel Howard (1894–1972) – politician
Sir Bernard Freyberg (1889–1963) – lieutenant-general
Sir Harold Gillies (1882–1960) – plastic surgeon
Dame Kiri Te Kanawa (born 1944) – opera singer
Sir Keith Park (1892–1975) – air chief marshal
Professor Alan MacDiarmid (1927–2007) – Nobel laureate chemist
Sir Peter Blake (1948–2001) – yachtsman
Dr C.E. (Clarence Edward) Beeby (1902–1998) – educationalist
Jack Lovelock (1910–1949) – athlete
Dr John Bedbrook – biotechnologist
James K. Baxter (1926–1972) – poet
Dr Fred Hollows (1929–1993) – eye surgeon
Sir Murray Halberg (born 1933) – athlete and philanthropist
Neil Finn (born 1958) – musician
Edward Gibbon Wakefield (1796–1862) – colony founder
David Lange (1942–2005) – politician
Sir Robert Muldoon (1921–1992) – politician
Thomas Edmonds – industrialist
Colin McCahon (1919–1987) – painter
Colin Murdoch (1929–2008) – inventor
Sir Archibald McIndoe (1900–1960) – plastic surgeon
Rev Samuel Marsden (1765–1838) – missionary
Peter Fraser (1884–1950) – politician
John Clarke (1948–2017) – comedian
Ettie Rout (1877–1936) – campaigner for safe sex
Arthur Lydiard (1917–2004) – popularised jogging
Kupe – discoverer of Aotearoa
Te Puea Hērangi (1883–1952) – Māori leader
Sir John Walker (born 1952) – runner
Tim Finn (born 1952) – musician
John A. Lee (1891–1982) – politician
Sir James Wattie (1902–1974) – industrialist
Sir Bill Hamilton (1899–1978) – inventor
Norman Kirk (1923–1974) – politician
Bill Gallagher (1911–1990) – inventor
Dr Michael King (1945–2004) – historian
Frances Hodgkins (1869–1947) – painter
George Nēpia (1905–1986) – All Black
Sir James Fletcher (1886–1974) – industrialist
Mother Aubert (1835–1926) – nun
Charles Heaphy (1820–1881) – explorer
A.H. Reed (1875–1975) – publisher
Frank Sargeson (1903–1982) – writer
Sir Roger Douglas (born 1937) – politician
Dr Matthew During (1956–2023) – neuroscientist
Te Kooti Arikirangi Te Turuki (c.1832–1893) – warrior
Hongi Hika (1772–1828) – warrior chief
Sir David Low (1891–1963) – cartoonist
Kate Edger (1857–1935) – women's pioneer
Dame Marie Clay (1926–2007) – educationalist
Rewi Alley (1897–1987) – sinophile
Thomas Rangiwahia Ellison (1867–1904) – rugby union captain
Rua Kenana Hepetipa (1869–1937) – prophet
Tahupotiki Wiremu Ratana (1873?–1939) – prophet
Aunt Daisy (1879–1963) – broadcaster
Charles Upham (1908–1994) – soldier
Ralph Hotere (1931–2013) – artist
Sir Richard Hadlee (born 1951) – cricketer
Billy T. James (1948–1991) – comedian
Sir Keith Sinclair (1922–1993) – historian
Charles Goldie (1870–1947) – painter
John Minto (born 1953) – activist
Rudall Hayward (1900–1974) – film maker
Witi Ihimaera (born 1944) – writer
John Te Rangianiwaniwa Rangihau (1919–1987) – Māori language promoter
Dave Dobbyn (born 1957) – songwriter
Russell Coutts (born 1962) – sailor
Jonah Lomu (1975–2015) – All Black
Peter Mahon (1923–1986) – lawyer
Georgina Beyer (born 1957) – transgender politician
A. J. Hackett (born 1958) – bungy jumping pioneer
Denny Hulme (1936–1992) – Formula One driver
Russell Crowe (born 1964) – actor

On the final programme, the 101st on the list was revealed:

101. Sir Mountford "Toss" Woollaston (1910–1998) – painter

Public rankings 
Ernest Rutherford (1871–1937) – scientist
Kate Sheppard (1848–1934) – suffragist
Edmund Hillary (1919–2008) – explorer and humanitarian
Charles Upham (1908–1994) – war hero
Billy T. James (1948–1991) – comedian
David Lange (1942–2005) – prime minister
Āpirana Ngata (1874–1950) – politician
Colin Murdoch (1929–2008) – inventor of the disposable syringe
Rua Kenana Hepetipa (1869–1937) – prophet
Roger Douglas (born 1937) – politician and economist

Other editions

Other countries have produced similar shows; see Greatest Britons spin-offs

References

External links 
New Zealand's Top 100 History Makers at Wayback Machine internet archive

2005 New Zealand television series debuts
2005 New Zealand television series endings
Greatest Nationals
Lists of New Zealand people
New Zealand reality television series
Prime (New Zealand TV channel) original programming
Television shows funded by NZ on Air
New Zealand television series based on British television series